Werner Neumann (born 1953, Freckenhorst) is a German jurist, lawyer and judge. Since 2010 he has been chief judge of the Federal Administrative Court of Germany.

External links
 Federal Administrative Court press release

1953 births
Living people
21st-century German judges
Jurists from North Rhine-Westphalia
People from Warendorf (district)